Arviat (syllabics: ᐊᕐᕕᐊᑦ; formerly called Eskimo Point until 1 June 1989) is a predominantly Inuit hamlet located on the western shore of Hudson Bay in the Kivalliq Region of Nunavut, Canada. Arviat ("place of the bowhead whale") is derived from the Inuktitut word arviq meaning "Bowhead whale". Earlier in history, its name was Tikirajualaaq ("a little long point"), and Ittaliurvik, ("a place where the people make tents").

Demographics 

Community 
Arviat is the southernmost community on the Nunavut mainland and is close to the geographical centre of Canada. In Arviat, Inuktitut and English are primarily spoken, having the third largest population in Nunavut, behind Rankin Inlet and Iqaluit. From the 2011 Canadian census to the 2016 Canadian census there was a population increase of 14.6%. The mayor of Arviat is Joe Savikataaq (Jr.). The hamlet of Arviat also possesses a Tim Hortons in the Northern Store and a self-serve Tim Hortons in the Quick Stop (owned by Northern Store).

The community became a hamlet under the name Eskimo Point (name first appeared on maps in 1738) in 1977.

Cargo and passenger air service is provided by Calm Air, Canadian North and Nolinor Aviation (charter only) out of Arviat Airport. Destinations include other settlements in Nunavut and Manitoba, including Winnipeg.

Hunting and fishing are very active in the community; they are the primary source of sustenance. Four locally operated stores - Padlei Co-op, Northern Stores, Arctic Connection and Eskimo Point Lumber Supply - carry a wide range of products.

To the south, the town of Churchill, Manitoba is accessible by boat (summer and fall only), snowmobile and Bombardier from Arviat and is often travelled to for supplies.

Arviat is well known around the Arctic for its artistic qualities. It is a thriving community with many talented musicians: Susan Aglukark, a well known musician; Simon "Johnny Cash of the North" Sigyariaq; the band Uniaqtuq, with Arsene, Pelagie and Mary Angalik; the Arviat Band, with John and Billy Kuksuk, Paul Kattau and others; the Irksuk band, played by Paul Irksuk and sons. All have had CDs recorded commercially.

Many types of wildlife are abundant. Within the vicinity of Arviat, polar bears, millions of migratory birds, beluga whales, and caribou are often spotted.

The only access is by air and snowmobile, but the Nunavut government and the federal Senate member for Nunavut, Dennis Patterson, are investigating the possibility of a highway from Thompson, Manitoba, Lynn Lake, or Gillam, Manitoba, or an extension of the Hudson Bay Railway from Churchill, Manitoba to Rankin Inlet via Arviat. Similar to other Arctic coast communities there is an annual sealift but it is not available to passengers.

Arviat was originally inhabited by the Paallirmiut, a coastal/inland Inuit band. In 1957, dying of starvation, the last remaining Ihalmiut, another Caribou Inuit band, were relocated to Arviat by the Royal Canadian Mounted Police. Though there are differences between the two bands, they recognize a need to work together in order to benefit the community.

In 1993, Mark Kalluak published a historical essay on soapstone carving in Arviat, entitled Pelts to Stone. A History of Arts and Crafts Production in Arviat.

Arviat was featured in Dancing Towards the Light, a 2017 CBC News short film and article telling the story of the hamlet's annual dance competition.

The community is home to Arviaqpaluk Radio, a community radio station which operates under an exemption from CRTC licensing for low-power broadcasters.

Politics
The community is represented in the Legislative Assembly of Nunavut by John Main in the electoral district of Arviat North-Whale Cove, and Joe Savikataaq in Arviat South. Savikataaq was Premier of Nunavut from 2018 to 2021.

Savikataaq's son, Joe Savikataaq Jr., became mayor of the community in March 2020, following the death in office of Bob Leonard.

Recreation
The Hudson Bay Quest sled-dog race was run from Churchill to Arviat for the first time in 2004.

Internet 
The community has been served by the Qiniq network since 2005. Qiniq is a fixed wireless service to homes and businesses, connecting to the outside world via a satellite backbone. The Qiniq network is designed and operated by SSI Micro.  In 2017, the network was upgraded to 4G LTE technology, and 2G-GSM for mobile voice.

Climate
According to the Köppen climate classification Arviat has a subarctic climate (Köppen Dfc). However, using Nordenskjöld's alternate formula for distinguishing Arctic from subarctic climates, it has a polar climate (Köppen ET); as expected from this, it is north of the Arctic tree line. Spring is slow to warm up, with June being cooler than September and May cooler than October. With a yearly mean of  it is the third-warmest in Nunavut and the maximum of  recorded on 22 July 1973 is second only to that of Kugluktuk.

See also

List of municipalities in Nunavut
Peter Kritaqliluk
Arviat Airport
Nancy Karetak-Lindell
John Pangnark
Andy Miki
McConnell River Migratory Bird Sanctuary
Arvia'juaq and Qikiqtaarjuk National Historic Site

References

Further reading

 
 
 Inuit Gallery of Vancouver. Arviat Artists of the Past, Present, and Future. Vancouver: Inuit Gallery of Vancouver, 1997. 
 Kalluak, Mark. Pelts to Stone A History of Arts & Crafts Production in Arviat. [Ottawa]: Indian and Northern Affairs Canada, 1993. 
 Maguire, Mary, and Lynn McAlpine. Attautsikut/Together Understanding Culture, Change and Success in Qitiqliq Secondary School and Arviat. Exemplary schools project technical report, 8. Toronto: Canadian Education Association, 1995. 
 Sharp, Jason M. Ground Truthing of Linear Magnetic Anomalies Near Arviat, Nunavut Territory. Yellowknife, NT: Indian and Northern Affairs Canada, NWT eology Division, 1999.
 Swinton, George. Arviat Eskimo Point. Vancouver: Marion Scott Gallery, 1989. 
 Tyrrell, M. 2006. "Making Sense of Contaminants: A Case Study of Arviat, Nunavut". Arctic. 59, no. 4: 370-380.

External links

Official website

Hudson's Bay Company trading posts in Nunavut
Populated places on Hudson Bay
Hamlets in the Kivalliq Region
Road-inaccessible communities of Nunavut